Raudsepp or Raudsep is a common Estonian surname (meaning blacksmith), and may refer to:

 Andreas Raudsepp (born 1993), footballer
 Hugo Raudsepp (1883–1952), playwright
 Jaan Raudsepp (1873–1945), politician
 Laimons Raudsepp (born 1951), volleyball player and coach
 Pavo Raudsepp (born 1973), cross-country skier

Occupational surnames
Estonian-language surnames